1981 ACC tournament may refer to:

 1981 ACC men's basketball tournament
 1981 ACC women's basketball tournament
 1981 Atlantic Coast Conference baseball tournament